John King is a fictional character appearing in American comic books published by Marvel Comics.

Publication history
King first appeared in the MAX miniseries the Hood issue one in 2002, appearing in all six issues. After a five-year hiatus then reappeared in the  New Avengers miniseries The Trust, and appeared in Secret Invasion issue four. He was a recurring character in the Dark Reign Hood series, which began in 2009, and recently appeared in The Siege: Storming Asgard miniseries.

Fictional character biography
John King is a former drug addict and alcoholic. At one point he fought and was defeated by the Rocket Racer. King is the cousin of Parker Robbins (who would later become the Hood). King and Robbins were close friends and both worked as criminals in New York City. The two attempt to raid a warehouse said to be housing a valuable cargo, where the demon Nisanti attacks John King. In retaliation, Robbins shoots and kills it. King then returns home to his apartment, where Robbins visits him and tells him that the costume he stole off the demon he killed has granted him super powers. John King then informs Robbins of a diamond heist which is taking place, and the two attempt to interfere and steal the diamonds. However, Robbins accidentally shoots a police officer and John King tells him to escape saying that he will take the blame. More police then arrive and John King is taken into custody where he is told that he will be put on trial for shooting the police officer unless he testifies that he was only the Hood's accomplice. John King refuses to claim that Robbins was the real culprit. Robbins them frames Madame Rapier for shooting the police officer which allows John King to be set free.

Following the "Civil War" storyline, John King was with Hood when he puts together his crime syndicate to take advantage of the Superhuman Registration Act. He attended Owl's auction where he was auctioning off a Deathlok replica until Hood attacked the auction and cause the apparent death of Owl. Later, John King was with Hood at Hank's Bar to eat and drink until they are attacked by Wolverine who overheard their plans with the Deathlok replica. John King and Hood managed to get away from Wolverine. John King was at Hood's meeting at a Chinese restaurant and was seen watching the beating on Tigra. John King told Hood and the other villains that they can use the Deathlok replica to rob the Brown Brothers Harriman & Co. Bank. Everyone agreed to the plan. After the successful bank robbery, John King was with Hood when he and his villain allies were present at watching the New Avengers fighting the Symbiotes on TV. The New Avengers raided the hideout and attacked Hood, John King, and the other villains. John King was among those apprehended by the New Avengers.

During the "Secret Invasion" storyline, John King came upstairs when Hood decided to lead his crime syndicate to fight the Skrulls.

During the Dark Reign storyline, John King was made into the Hood's lieutenant. Noticing John King's alcoholism, Hood discusses the situation of his demonic cloak. Upon pulling Hood out of his burning hideout, John King gives Hood a way to contact Satana. John King accompanied some villains to go out drinking. He was then arrested by Force and the authorities who learned that he worked for the Hood. Hood had Norman Osborn bail out John King and the other villains. John King carried out another heist for the Hood, this time giving instructions to Squid and Man-Fish to raid a cargo ship and to steal the equipment in the hold. John King then followed Hood into fighting Force only for him to witness Hood's villain allies be defeated by White Fang. John King later told Hood about Controller's manufacturing of the discord amongst Hood's villain allies.

John King later told Hood about Jonas Harrow taking Hood's army of villains' away.

After the "Siege of Asgard", the New Avengers captured John King and use him to track the Hood and Madame Masque. After a battle with Count Nefaria, they capture the villains and bring all four of them to Maria Hill to place them under arrest.

John King is later approached by a revived Thanos to join up with his incarnation of the Zodiac where he led the team as Cancer. Zodiac's mission was to steal different powerful items and take them out from Earth in order to bring balance to the planet and the cosmos. Captured after a battle with the Avengers, John King reveals Thanos's plan to the heroes.

Powers and abilities
King possesses no superhuman powers or abilities.

As Cancer, John King wears a special super-suit given to him by Thanos that gives him the appearance of a humanoid crab.

References

External links
 John King at Marvel Wiki
 John King at Comic Vine
 John King at Comic Book Database

2002 comics debuts
Characters created by Kyle Hotz
Characters created by Brian K. Vaughan
Fictional characters from New York City
Fictional gangsters
Marvel Comics characters